Do You Know is the sixth studio album by American singer Jessica Simpson. The album was first released digitally on September 5, 2008 for the US iTunes Store and physically on September 9, 2008 in the United States, Canada and Russia through a joint-venture between Columbia Nashville and Epic Records. The album was her first effort in an attempt to cross over with country music. Songwriter Brett James produced the album along with John Shanks. The album debuted at number one on the US Billboard Country Albums and at number four on the US Billboard 200 with sales of 65,000. It received mixed reviews from music critics.

Two singles were released from the record, the lead single, "Come on Over" debuting at number 41 on the Billboard Hot Country Songs chart. It broke a record held by Miranda Lambert ("Me and Charlie Talking") and Brad Cotter ("I Meant To") for highest-debuting first chart entry by a solo artist; both artists debuted at number 42 on that same chart. The song was a success and peaked at 18th in Hot Country Songs.
The second single, "Remember That", was released in October, and peaked at number forty-two on the Hot Country Songs chart.

Background
After the release of her 2006 pop album A Public Affair, Simpson stated she wanted to go back to her roots and do country music because she "has been brought up around country music", and wants to give something back.

Music and lyrics
The album opens with the lead single "Come On Over", which was co-written by country music artist Rachel Proctor, Victoria Banks and Simpson herself. The lyrics of the uptempo single focus on the narrator's paramour. Simpson said, "The fun thing about the song is that anxiety of wanting the guy to come over right then and there. Everybody's felt that before." The next track "Remember That" was co-written by country music writers Rachel Proctor and Victoria Banks. The lyrics of the single focus on a history of anger, violence and the strength that it takes for the victim to leave the abuser. In "Remember That" she sings: "It doesn’t matter how he hurts you / With his hands or with his words / You don’t deserve it / It ain’t worth it / Take your heart and run." The third track of the album "Pray Out Loud" is a mid-tempo song in the key of B major backed with acoustic guitar. The fourth track "You're My Sunday" is a moderate up-tempo song in the key of G minor backed by electric guitar, written by Simpson, Luke Laird, Hillary Lindsey. "Sipping on History" is a love ballad in the key of B major backed primarily by an acoustic guitar. The sixth track "Still Beautiful" is a moderate up-tempo song in the key of B major backed primarily by steel guitar. The seventh track "Still Don't Stop Me" is a ballad in the key of E major about a love gone bad, driven by acoustic guitar and percussion. "When I Loved You Like That", the eighth track, is an up-tempo song in the key of A major backed by electric and steel guitars and percussion. "Might as Well Be Making Love" track number nine, is a country-pop ballad in the key of F major driven primarily by acoustic guitar with steel guitar fills. "Man Enough" is an uptempo country in the key of A major song backed primarily by electric guitar, banjo, and steel guitar. "Do You Know" is a moderate up-tempo song written by Dolly Parton.

Critical reception

The album received generally mixed  reviews from critics.  The album was given a score of 58 out of 100 from Metacritic, indicating "mixed or average reviews" from music critics.

Simpson's hometown paper, the Dallas Morning News, rated it a C+, saying, "How much should we expect from Jessica Simpson's country music debut CD? If your answer is not much, then you won't be disappointed." Entertainment Weekly also awarded the album a C+ and, while acknowledging the quality of the writers associated with the project, offered this conclusion: "And though teaming up with frequent Carrie Underwood songwriter Hillary Lindsey for five tracks was a savvy move, we already have a Carrie Underwood, honey...and she probably turned these songs down." The Boston Herald said the effort "represents the worst in a genre that's come to deify Michael Bolton schmaltz while kicking Hank Williams' legacy to the curb," and awarded it a grade of D.

Joey Guerra of the Houston Chronicle felt that the album "lacks pizazz," and that, although "Simpson co-wrote several of the other tunes ... there's almost no emotional spark or sense of connection." The Fort Worth Star-Telegram, rating the album only two stars (out of five), questioned how Simpson could "squander the talents of Dolly Parton? The pair's title-track duet is an oversung misfire." The Miami Heralds Howard Cohen, in another two star review, concluded that Simpson failed to make a good country album, and instead made one that is "undistinguished" and "forgettable".

The Los Angeles Times gave the effort 2.5 stars (out of four), saying "Her struggle is most striking on the title track, written by Dolly Parton, who shows up to harmonize with Simpson ... The gap between novice and master couldn't be clearer."

Slant Magazine awarded only 1.5 stars (of five), saying Simpson "operates in precisely three modes as a singer: a mewling, whispered coo; a nasal, dead-eyed middle volume; and belting glory notes at full volume with a strangled, unappealing tone." Allmusic seemed to share Slant's view of Simpson's vocal skills, finding her performance "unfailingly listless no matter how many theatrical gestures she attempts to cram in her big boring ballad."

Awarding only one star, Las Vegas Weekly found the album to be filled with "tiresome ballads" performed with "no tooth, no gut, just monotony and palpable disinterest; even Jessica Simpson sounds bored with Jessica Simpson." The Worcester Telegram, while awarding 2 stars, was less charitable, finding that "Simpson sounds, at best, like a cat being tasered."

One of the few exceptions, the New York Post said that "she's created an album where she consistently shows off her full-bodied voice with solid, yet simple tunes that don't overthink the music." and "Do You Know is the CD's best song and the one that is bound to earn her a country Grammy in February." Also, Country Weekly magazine gave a three-star rating out of five, with critic Chris Neal saying that although Simpson seemed to be "trying a little too hard" on some songs, the album was "solid pop-country fare with a lyrical emphasis on sensuality and self-esteem."

Commercial performance
Despite selling only 65,000 copies in its first week, Do You Know debuted at number four on the US Billboard 200, but fell rapidly, dropping out of that list in only nine weeks. At the same time, it dropped rapidly out of the top twenty on the Country Albums Chart, where it had held the top spot for only one week. Overall, the album has dramatically underperformed compared to the sales of Simpson's previous album. As February 2009, it has sold 173,000 copies in the United States.

Promotion
It was announced that Simpson would be supporting Rascal Flatts on tour as their opening act.

Singles
Her debut country single, "Come On Over" was released to digital downloads on June 24, 2008.In the United States, "Come on Over" became the most-added song to country radio for the week of June 6, 2008, debuting at number 41 on the Billboard Hot Country Songs chart. It broke a record held by Miranda Lambert ("Me and Charlie Talking") and Brad Cotter ("I Meant To") for highest-debuting first chart entry by a solo artist; both artists debuted at number 42 on that same chart. Achievement entering reached Billboard Hot 100 at number sixty-five, becoming Simpson's first song to enter to this list since 2006. Also managed to position in Billboard Digital Songs at No. 41. As of July 2014, "Come on Over" has sold 470,000 paid digital downloads in the United States, according to Nielsen SoundScan. However, the song was a success and peaked at 18th in Hot Country Songs.

The second single, "Remember That", was released in October, and peaked at number forty-two on the Hot Country Songs chart. To date, "Remember That" has sold 207,000 paid digital downloads according to Nielsen Soundscan.

Track listing

Personnel

 Michael Angelos – video producer
 Judy Forde Blair – creative producer
 Tom Bukovac – electric guitar
 John Caldwell – assistant engineer, audio engineer
 Tammie Harris Cleek – creative producer
 Cacee Cobb – A&R
 Shannon Forrest – drums
 Lars Fox – Pro-Tools, digital editing
 Alex Gibson – audio engineer, engineer
 Craig Headen – audio engineer, engineer
 Brett James – background vocals
 Mike Johnson – pedal steel guitar
 Charlie Judge – keyboards, organ, piano, synthesizer strings
 Aaron Kasdorf – assistant engineer, audio engineer
 Troy Lancaster – electric guitar
 Hillary Lindsey – background vocals
 Nate Lowery – production assistant
 Scott McDaniel – creative director
 Andrew Mendelson – mastering
 Carole Ann Mobley – A&R Assistance
 Seth Morton – audio engineer
 Dolly Parton – duet vocals on "Do You Know"
 Devin Pense – direction
 Vance Powell – audio engineer, engineer
 Jeff Rothschild – drums, engineer
 John Shanks – audio production, bass guitar, acoustic guitar, electric guitar, producer
 Jessica Simpson – lead vocals
 Jimmie Lee Sloas – bass guitar
 Shari Sutcliffe – contractor, coordination
 Bryan Sutton – acoustic guitar
 Ilya Toshinsky – acoustic guitar
 Luke Wooten – mixing
 Craig Young – bass guitar
 Jonathan Yudkin – fiddle, mandolin

Charts

Weekly charts

Year-end charts

Release history

References

External links
 

2008 albums
Albums produced by John Shanks
Jessica Simpson albums
Columbia Records albums
Albums produced by Brett James